The following lists events that happened during 2003 in Sri Lanka.

Incumbents
President: Chandrika Kumaratunga.
Prime Minister: Ranil Wickremesinghe.
Chief Justice: Sarath N. Silva.

Governors
 Central Province – Monty Gopallawa 
 North Central Province – G. M. S. Samaraweera (until 27 August); Jagath Balasuriya (starting 27 August)
 North Eastern Province – Asoka Jayawardena  
 North Western Province – Siripala Jayaweera 
 Sabaragamuwa Province – C. N. Saliya Mathew 
 Southern Province – Kingsley Wickramaratne 
 Uva Province – Sirisena Amarasiri (until 25 April); Nanda Mathew (starting 25 April)
 Western Province – Alavi Moulana

Chief Ministers
 Central Province – W. M. P. B. Dissanayake (until 29 May); Wasantha Aluvihare (starting 5 June)
 North Central Province – Berty Premalal Dissanayake
 North Western Province – Athula Wijesinghe
 Sabaragamuwa Province – Mohan Ellawala 
 Southern Province – H. G. Sirisena 
 Uva Province – Aththintha Marakalage Buddhadasa 
 Western Province – Reginald Cooray

Events
Tropical cyclone Very Severe Cyclonic Storm BOB 01  takes aim at Sri Lanka making landfall on 16 May 2003, the storm produced record amounts of rainfall and led to severe flooding in more low elevation areas of the nation. The storm would end up displacing 800,000 residents as a result of the severe flooding.
In October 2003, the LTTE issues a proposal known as the Interim Self Governing Authority. Once approved, it will assure the LTTE governance of the eastern areas of Sri Lanka, getting them closer to establishing a Tamil Eelam (a state in which is separate from Sri Lanka itself).

Notes

a.  Gunaratna, Rohan. (1998). Pg.353, Sri Lanka's Ethnic Crisis and National Security, Colombo: South Asian Network on Conflict Research.

References

 
Years of the 21st century in Sri Lanka
Sri Lanka